Birangona: Women of War is a British one-act play by Leesa Gazi about the untold true stories of female survivors and sufferers, Birangona, of the Bangladesh Liberation War, during which over 200,000 women were raped and tortured. The theatrical production is dedicated to narrating the stories of war heroines from their perspective.

Cast
Leesa Gazi as Moroyom
Amith Rahman as multiple shadow characters
Director: Filiz Ozcan
Designer and illustrator: Caitlin Abbott
Lighting designer (English version): Salvatore Scollo
Lighting designer (Bengali version): Nasirul Haque Khokon
Videographer: Fahmida Islam
Sound design: Ahsan Reza Khan
Artwork: Caitlin Abbott (from an original photo by Naib Uddin Ahmed)
Producer: Buffy Sharpe for Komola Collective
Vocals: Sohini Alam
Voice artist: Faisal Gazi
Original poem: Tarfia Faizullah

Development

Birangona: Women of War was based on the concept and research by Leesa Gazi, who is also the central actor as well as one of the playwrights of the play. In 2010, Gazi met 21 Birangona women in Sirajganj, Bangladesh and filmed their accounts.

In August 2013, Gazi went back to the women with her theatre company Komola Collective, a London-based theatre and arts company,. to develop an R&D theatrical piece based on their testimonies. Their accounts were interwoven into the play. The play is the Komola Collective's debut production.

Production
Birangona: Women of War is directed by Filiz Ozcan and written by Samina Lutfa and Leesa Gazi.

Tour
An R&D show of Birangona: Women of War was held in Dhaka to get feedback from a select audience in 2013.

The production was first staged by Komola Collective in Dhaka at the Liberation War Museum in March 2014. The play premiered in London on 9 April of the same year.

Shows of the production were staged at the Gulshan Club, Central Shaheed Minar, the National Museum Auditorium, the Experimental Theatre Hall of Bangladesh Shilpakala Academy, the Mansur Hall in Sirajgonj and at the Theatre Institute Chattagram in December 2014.

Awards
Birangona: Women of War was nominated for the Offie Award, the London-based prestigious theatre award, which sorted the play in the productions that defy traditional categories.

Reception
Redhotcurry.com said, "'Birangona: Women of War' oroduction [production] gives a powerful and necessary platform to the many hundreds of thousands of women systematically raped and tortured during that time." Akram Khan said, "The play is not only culturally important but also educationally important - revealing atrocities which have been swept aside over the course of history."

Christopher Hong of The Public Reviews rated the play 3.5/5 and said, "...it does not apportion blame but simply focuses on telling the stories as they are achieving what it sets out to do."

Saurav Dey of The Daily Star said, "The 60-minute play is powerful; no artificial or unnecessary elements distracted the audience at any point in the performance. More such productions need to be staged across different parts of the country so that Birangonas get their due honour. Komola Collective certainly deserves a tip of the hat for bringing forth the ignored part of history in the form of a piece of art."

Tahmima Anam of The Guardian called it "A powerful new play... groundbreaking production." The Stage called it "...an illuminating and affecting piece." Daniel Nelson of One World said, "It is an intelligently conceived and executed tale."

See also
Rape during the Bangladesh Liberation War
 Nemesis by Natyaguru Nurul Momen
 Nondito Noroke by Humayun Ahmed
 NityaPurana by Masum Reza
 Che'r Cycle by Mamunur Rashid

References

2014 plays
One-act plays
Aftermath of the Bangladesh Liberation War
Plays by Leesa Gazi
Bangladeshi drama
Bengali-language plays
Theatre in Bangladesh
Bangladeshi plays